David Davidson (born February 15, 1953) is an American film director. His films, focusing primarily on music, the arts and African-American culture have been broadcast nationally on PBS and on international television. He is best known for A Place Out of Time: The Bordentown School, and HANS RICHTER: Everything Turns – Everything Revolves.

Early life and education
Davidson was born on the South Side of Chicago in 1953. Subsequently, his parents moved to Washington DC, Philadelphia, Rochester, New York and eventually back to the Southern Suburbs of Chicago, where he graduated from high school. At that time Davidson's father passed his 16mm Bolex camera on to him and he started experimenting with film. Davidson studied at The University of Illinois, majoring first in Political Science then moving to an independent study degree program in Film under Julius Rascheff and photography with Art Sinsabaugh. After receiving his BA, Davidson worked as a news photographer for WCIA Television and in 1978 was accepted to the NYU Graduate Institute of Film and Television, where he received The Warner Fellowship.

References 

1953 births
American film producers
Film directors from Illinois
Living people